Richard O'Connell (13 March 1892 – 1 October 1964) was an Irish Cumann na nGaedheal politician. A former Army officer, he was first elected to Dáil Éireann as a Cumann na nGaedheal Teachta Dála (TD) for the Limerick constituency at a by-election on 28 May 1924. He was re-elected at the June 1927 and September 1927 general elections but lost his seat at the 1932 general election. He stood again at the 1933 general election but was not elected.

His nephew Tom O'Donnell was a TD for Limerick East from 1961 to 1987. His grand-nephew Kieran O'Donnell is currently a TD for Limerick City.

See also
Families in the Oireachtas

References

1892 births
1964 deaths
Cumann na nGaedheal TDs
Members of the 4th Dáil
Members of the 5th Dáil
Members of the 6th Dáil
Politicians from County Limerick